Deh-e Seyyedha (also Romanized as Deh-e Seyyedhā; also known as Dehseyyedā) is a village in Javar Rural District, in the Central District of Kuhbanan County, Kerman Province, Iran. At the 2006 census, its population was 23, in 5 families.

References 

Populated places in Kuhbanan County